Sunset or Brothers is an 1830-1835 oil on canvas painting by Caspar David Friedrich, now in the Hermitage Museum in St Petersburg, Russia.

See also
List of works by Caspar David Friedrich

References

External links

1835 paintings
Paintings by Caspar David Friedrich
Paintings in the collection of the Hermitage Museum